André van der Merwe is a conductor, choral music arranger, and composer from Durbanville, Western Cape, South Africa. He studied for his Bachelor of Music at the University of Cape Town but due to an injury he changed his studies to a Bachelor of Drama (Directing) at the Stellenbosch University  He served as the chairperson of the National Artistic Committee the 2016 World Choir Games held in Tshwane, South Africa.

He is currently the conductor of the Stellenbosch University Choir, the Stellenberg Girls Choir and his adult choir, Voces Cordis.  The Stellenbosch University Choir has been voted best in the world by Interkultur most of the years between 2012 and 2020.

References

Living people
South African conductors (music)
Year of birth missing (living people)
People from the Western Cape
21st-century conductors (music)